The Raising of the Cross is part of the Crucifixion of Jesus, and has been a distinct subject of Christian art.

Notable depictions include The Elevation of the Cross by Peter Paul Rubens and The Raising of the Cross by Rembrandt.

References

Crucifixion of Jesus
Paintings depicting the Crucifixion of Jesus
In John's gospel, Jesus predicted that he would be "lifted up from the earth" (John 12:32) in order to draw all men to himself. John notes that Jesus was referring to his death (John 12:33).